Uthman Mosque (also known as 'Othman' Mosque or 'Mosquée de Othmane') is a mosque for Muslims of all traditions and ethnic groups inaugurated on 1 April 2006 in Villeurbanne, France, near Lyon.

It is a three-storey building paid for by contributions from French Muslims, covering 1200 square metres and including a large library and an Arabic school catering for 250 students.

References

External links
 

2006 establishments in France
Buildings and structures in Rhône (department)
Mosques completed in 2006
Mosques in France